Cognatiyoonia sediminum is a Gram-negative, strictly aerobic and short rod-shaped bacterium from the genus of Cognatiyoonia which has been isolated from marine sediments from the northern Okinawa Trough in China.

References

Rhodobacteraceae
Bacteria described in 2015